Novatec Solar is a German provider of solar boilers based on linear Fresnel collector technology based in Karlsruhe. Novatec Solar specialises in turnkey delivery including manufacture, supply, and assembly of solar fields.

Timeline
In March 2011, ABB acquired 35% of Novatec Solar.

In April 2013, ABB sold its stake in Novatec Solar to existing shareholder Transfield Holdings.  After the transaction, Transfield owned approximately 85% of Novatec Solar.

In November 2014, Novatec announced to its bondholders that due to financial problems it was seeking a restructuring of its debt. Andreas Wittke (CEO) and Oliver Mundle (CFO) resigned their positions in the same month.

Projects
Novatec Solar has realized three projects with its linear Fresnel technology.

Puerto Errado 1
Puerto Errado 1, located in southern Spain's Calasparra, was connected to the grid in 2009. With a capacity of 1.4 MW electric it was the first commercial Fresnel power plant in the world. It has a mirror surface of 18,000 m² divided in two collector rows with a length of 800 m each.

Puerto Errado 2
Puerto Errado 2 is located next to Puerto Errado 1 in southern Spain. It has a capacity of 30MW electric and a mirror surface of 300,000 m² and is in commercial operation since 2012.

Liddell
The Liddell solar field was contracted in 2010. It has a capacity of 9MW thermal and was used as a fuel saver for the Liddell Power Station.

References

External links
Official Website
Pivotal Solar Website
Solar Power Company

Companies based in Karlsruhe
Solar energy companies of Germany